Saint Sebastian is an early sculpture by the Italian artist Gian Lorenzo Bernini. Executed in 1617 and 1618, it features the Christian martyr Saint Sebastian pinned to a tree, his flesh filled with arrows. It is smaller than life size. The sculpture is part of the Carmen Cervera's private collection and is currently shown in the Museo Thyssen-Bornemisza in Madrid.

See also
List of works by Gian Lorenzo Bernini

Notes

References

Further reading

External links

1610s sculptures
Marble sculptures in Spain
Christian art about death
Sculptures by Gian Lorenzo Bernini
Bernini
Torture in art